Government First Grade College, Malleshwaram, is a general degree college located at Malleshwaram, Bangalore, Karnatka. It is established in the year 2007. The college is affiliated with Bangalore University. This college offers different courses in arts and science and commerce.

Departments

Science
Physics
Chemistry
Mathematics
Botany
Zoology
Computer Science

Arts and Commerce
Kannada
English
History
Political Science
Sociology
Economics
Business Administration
Commerce

Accreditation
The college is  recognized by the University Grants Commission (UGC).

References

External links
http://gfgc.kar.nic.in/malleshwaram/

Educational institutions established in 2007
2007 establishments in Karnataka
Colleges affiliated to Bangalore University
Colleges in Bangalore
Malleshwaram